"Springtime for Hitler" is a song written and composed by Mel Brooks for his 1968 film The Producers.

In the film, the 2001 musical, and 2005 film adaptation the song is part of the stage musical titled Springtime for Hitler, which the two protagonists produce on Broadway. It was orchestrated by Philip J. Lang and staged by Alan Johnson for the former, with the latter productions orchestrated by Doug Besterman and staged by director Susan Stroman.

Composition and lyrics 
In the film, it has four sections. It begins with a 4/4 interlude sung by actors dressed as Bavarian villagers who have found "a new leader to restore Germany's former glory."

For the main melody, the curtain opens to reveal chorus girls dressed in Ziegfeld-esque costumes laden with German and Nazi iconography and a male Nazi soloist singing:

Springtime for Hitler and Germany
Deutschland is happy and gay
We're marching to a faster pace
Look out! Here comes the master race

Springtime for Hitler and Germany
Rhineland's a fine land once more
Springtime for Hitler and Germany
Watch out, Europe, we're going on tour

Springtime for Hitler and Germany
Winter for Poland and France
Springtime for Hitler and Germany
Come on Germans, go into your dance.

The next section is a tap-dance break with two solo lines in between; "I was born in Düsseldorf and that is why they call me Rolf", "Don't be stupid, be a smarty! Come and join the Nazi Party!"

The latter line was dubbed by Mel Brooks in all versions of the song.

The final section has the entire company reprising the main melody in slow 3/4 march tempo.

Moreover, the verses are accompanied by a "happy chorus line".

Comparison between 1968 film, musical, and 2005 film 
In the 1968 film, stage musical, and 2005 film, the Bavarian interlude, Ziegfeld menagerie, and Busby Berkeley-styled swastika formation remain largely unchanged.

The first major difference between the 1968 film and the stage musical and 2005 film concerned the character who played the part of Adolf Hitler and the circumstances of Springtime for Hitler's surprise success. In the 1968 film, by the time the song was over, the audience was ready to leave the theatre in disgust and horror, with Max and Leo, ecstatic their plan worked, retreating to a bar. But as the scene changes to reveal hippie actor Lorenzo St. Dubois aka 'L.S.D.'s (played by Dick Shawn) as Adolf Hitler, his wild improvisations prove to be an instant hit, leaving them in hysterical fits of laughter.

In the musical and 2005 film, the character L.S.D. was omitted and the plot was changed to have the character Roger De Bris, the show's director, play Adolf Hitler after the original actor, the playwright Franz Liebkind, "broke (his) leg". The character Ulla is now the part of the cast as Marlene Dietrich and a Black Eagle, and Roger appears immediately after the dance break. He then sings a new section called "Heil Myself", followed by a reprise of the Bavarian interlude done in the style of Judy Garland. Most productions would follow this with a monologue of Hitler's rise to power. In others, it is followed by a satirical "Challenge Tap" dance with the Allied Leaders.

In the musical, "Springtime for Hitler" is directly presented to the musical audience, with the positive reception confirmed in the following scene in Max and Leo's office. In the 2005 film, the audience is shown preparing to leave in disgust (similar to the 1968 film), but returns to their seats laughing after Roger's flamboyant Hitler appears.

Track listing 
7" single High Anxiety by Mel Brooks — 1978, Asylum Records E-45458, United States and Canada
Side 1. "High Anxiety" (2:30)
side 2. "Springtime For Hitler" (3:22)

Accolades 
The song (in the original version from the 1967 film The Producers) was ranked 80th on the list of the "100 greatest songs in American cinema" released by the American Film Institute (AFI) in 2004.

References

External links 
 Springtime for Hitler at Songfacts

Songs about Adolf Hitler
1967 songs
Songs written for films
Works by Mel Brooks
Comedy songs
Satirical songs
Songs from musicals
Film theme songs